Gaz Gavban (also Romanized as Gaz Gāvbān, Gaz-e Gāvbān, Gazgāvbān, and Gez-e Gāvbān; also known as Gaz Gāvīān) is a village in Qaryah ol Kheyr Rural District, in the Central District of Darab County, Fars Province, Iran. At the 2006 census, its population was 40, in 10 families.

References 

Populated places in Darab County